Manasse Kusu (born 22 December 2001) is a Swedish-Congolese footballer who plays for Öster.

Club career
After playing for Öster on loan in the second half of the 2021 season, Kusu signed a three-year contract with the club on 24 January 2022.

Personal life
Kusu is born in Congo, but moved with his mother to Sweden at age 12.

References

2001 births
Swedish people of Democratic Republic of the Congo descent
Swedish sportspeople of African descent
Living people
Swedish footballers
Association football midfielders
Sweden youth international footballers
IFK Norrköping players
IF Sylvia players
Östers IF players
Allsvenskan players
Ettan Fotboll players
Superettan players